One on One is the debut (and to date only) solo studio album from Alabama lead singer Randy Owen. The album was released on Broken Bow Records on November 4, 2008. The album has produced two charted singles on the Hot Country Songs chart. The first of these, "Braid My Hair", reached number 45 in mid-2008 under the promotion of DMP Records. "Like I Never Broke Her Heart", the second single, debuted in late 2008 and peaked at 41. "Holding Everything", a duet with fiddler Megan Mullins, was the third and final single, although it did not chart. John Rich of Big & Rich produced the album. This would become Randy Owen's only solo studio album to be recorded under his name as he would go on to eventually rejoin and reunite with his bandmates to reform Alabama in 2010. In 2015, the title track "One on One" was reused by Randy Owen as an Alabama band member and he re-recorded a new version of the song for the band's Southern Drawl album.

Track listing
"I Confess" (John Rich, Randy Owen, James Otto) – 3:15
"Holding Everything" (Dolly Parton) – 3:13
duet with Megan Mullins
"Like I Never Broke Her Heart" (Mitzi Dawn, J. T. Harding, Shannon Lawson) – 3:24
"Braid My Hair" (Christopher Gray, Brent Wilson) – 4:23
"One on One" (Owen) – 3:05
"Let's Pretend We're Strangers for the Night" (Lawson, Rich, Owen) – 3:38
"Slow and Steady" (Dale Morris) – 3:01
"Urban's on the Country Radio" (Owen) – 3:48
"No One Can Love You Anymore" (Owen, Rich, Vicky McGehee) – 4:33
"Barbados" (Owen) – 2:55
"Pray Me Back Home Again" (Owen) – 4:20

Personnel 
 Randy Owen – lead vocals
 Jeffrey Roach – acoustic piano, Wurlitzer electric piano, Hammond B3 organ, synthesizers
 Mike Rojas – acoustic piano, Hammond B3 organ
 Shawn Pennington – electric guitars
 Adam Shoenfeld – baritone guitar, electric guitars
 Danny Rader – acoustic guitar
 John Willis – acoustic guitar
 Pat McGrath – gut-string guitar
 Mike Johnson – steel guitar
 Gary Morse – steel guitar
 Larry Paxton – bass guitar, string arrangements
 Ethan Pilzer – bass guitar
 Michael Rhodes – bass guitar
 Steve Brewster – drums, percussion
 Jonathan Yudkin – fiddle, mandolin, strings, string arrangements and composer
 Kristin Wilkinson – string arrangements
 Nashville String Machine – strings
 Kim Fleming – backing vocals
 Wes Hightower – backing vocals
 Aaron Mason – backing vocals
 James Otto – backing vocals
 Megan Mullins – lead vocals (2)

Chart performance
Album

Singles

References
Allmusic (see infobox)

2008 debut albums
BBR Music Group albums
Randy Owen albums
Albums produced by John Rich